This is a list of Sites of Community Importance in Balearic Islands.

See also 
 List of Sites of Community Importance in Spain

References 
 Lisf of sites of community importance in Balearic Islands

Protected areas of the Balearic Islands